George Lyons (born December 9, 1947) is a scholar and retired professor of New Testament studies at Northwest Nazarene University. Dr. Lyons began teaching at Olivet Nazarene University in 1977.

Biography

Personal life 
George Lyons was born on December 9, 1947 in Richmond, Indiana, United States. He was the son of Galen H. and Georgia M. (Sebby) Lyons. He Married Terre Lynn Hickok, May 24, 1969. He has 2 Children: Kara Joy, Nathanael David.

Education
Lyons holds a bachelor degrees from Olivet Nazarene University (1970) and a master of Divinity from Nazarene Theological Seminary (1973) as well as a Phd in New Testament, from Emory University (1982).

Career
Lyons was professor of biblical literature (New Testament and Greek) at Olivet Nazarene University from 1977 to 1991. He was coordinator of the graduate religion literature program (1986-1990) and the department chairman of biblical literature at Olivet Nazarene University (1989-1991).

He was professor of New Testament at Northwest Nazarene from 1991 to 2013. He was also chair of the University Faculty (2008-10).

He has also served as a visiting professor at Nazarene Theological Seminary (1982, 86, 89), Point Loma Nazarene University, Mount Vernon Nazarene University, Nazarene Theological College Australia (1989-1990, 91, 96) and Nazarene Theological College England, Southeast Asia Nazarene Bible College (Bangkok, Thailand) and European Nazarene College (Besingen, Germany and extensions in Razgrad, Bulgaria; Lisbon, Portugal; and Montpelier and Paris, France). He has also taught in China.

He has been the New Testament editor of the Beacon Hill Press of Kansas City. He is the founding director of the Wesley Center Online resources website.

Memberships
Lyons was a member doctrine of church commission of the Church of Nazarene, Kansas City (1985-1989) and member curriculum committee, since 1990. He was Coordinator of the Kankakee County Hunger Walk (1985-1990).

He has been a member and past president of the Wesleyan Theological Society (member (1977-), secretary membership committee 1986, Second vice president 1992, president 1993-1994). He has been as a member of the Society of Biblical Literature (1972-).

Theology
Lyons served the Church of the Nazarene in the Wesleyan-Holiness tradition. Greathouse and Lyons' New Beacon Bible Commentary (2008) has been described to be part of the Wesleyan tradition. He is believed to affirm open theism.

Publications

Books

Chapters

Articles
Lyons has several articles that appear in the Wesleyan Theological Journal.

Notes and references

Citations

Sources

External links
 Wesley Center Online

1947 births
20th-century_Protestant_theologians
21st-century_Protestant_theologians
American Christian theologians
Bible commentators
Emory University alumni
Living people
Nazarene theologians
Northwest Nazarene University faculty
Olivet Nazarene University alumni
Olivet Nazarene University faculty